Bullo is a surname. Notable people with the surname include: 

Mirko Bullo (born 1959), Swiss football player
Nicole Bullo (born 1987), Swiss ice hockey player

See also
Bello (surname)